Friend or Foe? is an American game show based on knowledge and trust which aired on Game Show Network. Three teams of two strangers attempted to persuade their partner into sharing their accumulated winnings rather than stealing it for themselves.

The show premiered June 3, 2002, and aired for two seasons totaling 105 episodes. It was hosted by Lisa Kennedy Montgomery, who was credited as "Kennedy", except for the April Fool's Day 2003 episode (the final first-run episode), in which Mark L. Walberg, the host of Russian Roulette, hosted as part of GSN's April Fools prank; the hosts traded shows for the day, made cameo appearances, and played for charity on Lingo.

The show "re-debuted" in 2008, re-airing episodes from the series during that year.

Gameplay

Main game
At the start of the game, three of the six contestants secretly choose one of the other three contestants as their teammates. If two or more contestants choose the same contestant as a potential partner, the potential partner selects the contestant to team with. A second round of voting is held if necessary until all three teams have been formed. Each team is then given a "trust fund." In season one, each team's fund began with $200.

The main game is played in two rounds. In each round, Montgomery asks a series of four multiple-choice questions, each with four answer choices. On each question, the teammates have 15 seconds to agree on an answer and simultaneously lock it in on separate keypads. Correct answers add $500 to the trust fund in round one, and $1,000 in round two, and there is no penalty for incorrect answers or failing to respond in time. At the end of each round, the team with the lowest total is eliminated and must go to the "Trust Box" to determine the fate of their money. If there is a tie for low score, the team that took more time overall to lock in their answers for that round is eliminated.

The Trust Box presents the eliminated team with a variation of the prisoner's dilemma. Each contestant attempts to persuade the other to trust him or her, after which they secretly vote "friend" or "foe." If both vote "friend," they split the trust fund evenly. If one votes "friend" and the other "foe," the foe collects the entire trust fund and the friend receives nothing. If both vote "foe," neither contestant wins any money.

Endgame
In the "Right or Wrong?" bonus round, the team has 60 seconds to answer a maximum of 10 questions, each of which has two answer choices. Each correct answer adds $500 to the trust fund, while each miss penalizes the team with a strike. The round ends immediately if the team earns three strikes. Answering all 10 questions correctly doubles the entire trust fund, for a potential maximum of $22,400. The team then advances to the Trust Box in the manner described above.

Season two changes
In season two, contestants were randomly assigned to teams instead of secretly selecting partners, and the teams were not spotted any money at the beginning of the game. As a result, the potential prize decreased to $22,000. If a team was eliminated without earning any money, they were given $200 to risk at the Trust Box.

See also
 Shafted (British game show similar to Friend or Foe?)
 Golden Balls (British game show that used the same payout structure as Friend or Foe?)
 Take It All (American game show with the final round similar to Friend or Foe?)

References

Further reading

2000s American game shows
2002 American television series debuts
2003 American television series endings
English-language television shows
Game Show Network original programming